Ground Into the Dirt is the third and final studio album by the noise rock band King Snake Roost, released on 20 June 1990 by Amphetamine Reptile Records.

Release and reception 
David Sprague of the Trouser Press said that Ground Into the Dirt "proffers a sound at once burlier and more graceful, not unlike Killdozer fused with Funkadelic" and that it was the best place to start for those unfamiliar with the band.

Track listing

Personnel 
Adapted from the Ground Into the Dirt liner notes.

King Snake Roost
Bill Bostle – drums
Peter Hill – vocals
David Quinn – bass guitar, vocals, guitar, illustration
Charles Tolnay – guitar

Additional musicians and production
Butch Vig – production, recording

Release history

References

External links 
 

1990 albums
Albums produced by Butch Vig
Amphetamine Reptile Records albums
King Snake Roost albums